Edward Orton may refer to:

 Edward Orton Sr. (1829–1899), first president of Ohio State University
 Edward Orton Jr. (1863–1932), American academic administrator, businessman and ceramic engineer